The 1905 Washington University football team was an American football team that represented Washington University in St. Louis as an independent during the 1905 college football season. In its first and only season under head coach Charles A. Fairweather, the team compiled a 7–3–2 record and outscored opponents by a total of 175 to 88. The team played its home games at Washington University Stadium, which opened in 1904 as World's Fair Stadium and is now known as Francis Olympic Field.

Schedule

References

Washington University
Washington University Bears football seasons
Washington University football